Strong Bad Sings (and Other Type Hits) is a compilation album featuring songs by Strong Bad and other characters from the Homestar Runner web cartoon series. Strong Bad Sings is the sole audio CD spinoff from the online cartoon world of homestarrunner.com. The songs represent various pastiches of popular music, such as glam metal, folk, hip hop, techno and indie rock.

The songs "Trogdor" and "Because It's Midnite" appear in Guitar Hero II and Guitar Hero Encore: Rocks the 80s, respectively. There is also a "Secret Song" that features Homestar Runner very late into the last track. The disc also contains a music video for "These Peoples Try to Fade Me", inferred to be animated by The Cheat, in the style of Powered by the Cheat.

Track listing

Musicians
Matt Chapman – Lead vocals, piano
Mike Chapman – Guitar, bass, keyboards
Missy Palmer – Lead vocals, guitar

Y-O-U

Nick Niespodziani – Backing vocals, guitar, drums, keyboards, programming
Peter Olson – Guitar, bass, programming
Mark Cobb – Drums
Eric Harlan Park – Keyboards, piano
Matt Sonnicksen – Guitar, drums, keyboards, piano, backing vocals, bells
J. Christopher Arrison – Guitar, bass, piano

Writing credits
Music and lyrics for tracks 4 and 13 were written by Missy Palmer. All other lyrics were written by The Brothers Chaps. Music for tracks 5, 7, 9, 14, 17, 18, and 19 was written by The Brothers Chaps with members of Y-O-U. Music for tracks 8, 11, and 16 was written by The Brothers Chaps with J. Christopher Arrison and members of Y-O-U. All other music was written by The Brothers Chaps.

References

External links 
"Strong Bad Sings", the cartoon that inspired the CD's title and some of its songs
Page for the album at Homestar Runner Wiki

2003 albums
Comedy albums by American artists
2000s comedy albums
Self-released albums
Homestar Runner